The Scots Kirk is The Kirk, the Church of Scotland.

It can also refer to several Scottish churches abroad:
Scots Kirk, Hamilton, New South Wales, Australia
Scots Kirk, Mosman, New South Wales, Australia
The Scots Kirk, Paris, France
Scots Kirk, Rotterdam, the Netherlands
Scots Kirk, Lausanne, Switzerland
St Andrew's Scots Kirk, Kingston, Jamaica
Church of St Andrew and St Columba, Mumbai, India

See also
Scots College (disambiguation)